Held for Ransom is a 2000 direct-to-video thriller film starring Dennis Hopper, Zachery Ty Bryan, Morgan Fairchild and Debi Mazar. It was directed and written by Lee Stanley based on the novel by Lois Duncan.

Plot
Five spoiled high-school students are kidnapped and held for ransom in a remote swamp area.

Cast
 Dennis Hopper as J.D.
 Zachery Ty Bryan as Glenn Kirtland
 Kam Heskin as Jesse McCormick
 Tsianina Joelson as Marianne
 Jordan Brower as Bruce Kirtland
 Randy Spelling as Dexter
 Paul Dillon as John
 Morgan Fairchild as Mrs. Kirtland
 John Getz as Mr. Kirtland
 Timothy Bottoms as Fred Donavan
 Debi Mazar as Rita
 Joan Van Ark as Nancy Donovan
 Tyler Kuhn as Randy Donovan
 Shelly Burch as Mrs. McCormick
 Robert Noble as Mrs. Godfrey
 Keith MacKechnie as Detective Van Bommel
 David Siegel as Crime Scene Detective
 Russell Warner as Officer Matthews
 J.D. Husocki as Officer Bronson
 Joe Hess as Swamp Man #1
 Thomas Rosales, Jr. as Swamp Man #2

Production
It was filmed over three weeks 1999 in the Everglades, Miami and Orlando Disney's MGM studios and surrounding areas.

References

External links
 
 
 

2000 direct-to-video films
American thriller films
Films based on American novels
Films based on thriller novels
2000 thriller films
2000 films
MoviePass Films films
American direct-to-video films
2000s English-language films
2000s American films